Daşlıyataq (also, Dashlyyatag) is a village in the Davachi Rayon of Azerbaijan.  The village forms part of the municipality of Günəşli.

References 

Populated places in Shabran District